Meadows Place is a city located in Fort Bend County in the U.S. state of Texas within the  metropolitan area. As of the 2020 U.S. Census, the city population was 4,767.

Meadows Place was part of Stafford's extraterritorial jurisdiction prior to incorporation on November 14, 1983. Meadows Place was incorporated as Meadows, but this was changed to "Meadows Place" in 1997 due to postal conflicts with a city of a similar name, Meadow, Texas. The city of Meadows Place has its own police force and 24/7 fire and EMS protection. The current mayor is Charles Jessup.

Meadows Place shares a ZIP code (77477) with Stafford, Texas, and the post office is in Stafford, but postal addresses in Meadows Place are designated as "Meadows Place, Texas".

History

Meadows Place began as the Meadows Municipal Utility District, which had been established in 1967.The Meadows Place development farmland was purchased by Ayrshire Corporation. In 1968 the first houses were constructed by Ayrshire Corporation, a second-generation family-owned company founded in 1946. Ayrshire has developed mix use property throughout the United States and Australia. The Meadows place development is representative of their development capabilities. Meadows incorporated on November 14, 1983, to avoid being annexed by Houston. In 1990 the city had 4,606 residents. The population in 2010 was listed as 4,660 residents. In June 2012, Meadows Place received an award from Keep Texas Beautiful for a water reuse project that culminated in a beautiful new lake in the center of the city which, in addition to recreation, is used for irrigation of most of the city's parks land and baseball complex. So dramatic was the transformation, Meadows Place was asked to make a poster presentation at the 28th annual Water ReUse Symposium in Denver, Colorado. The presentation—"No City is Too Small to Receive Benefits from Water Reuse"—met with such acclaim they were invited to share their story at an international water convention. Hundreds of people from the US, Canada, Mexico, even Sweden and Norway, have come to see how a small city with limited resources could bring such a project to fruition.

In 2013 Meadows Place became the first city in Fort Bend County to fully convert to radio-read "Smart" water meters which send data directly from the consumer's yard to meter reading software housed in the utility department. This allows the city to help homeowners monitor usage on a 24-hour-a-day basis and automatically posts alerts for possible leaks based on past usage history. Homeowners appreciate the accuracy and the information.

Meadows Place is the smallest city in Texas with its own dedicated police department, fire station, and EMS.

Geography

Meadows Place is located along the northeast border of Fort Bend County at  (29.649599, –95.588747). It is bordered by the city of Sugar Land to the west, Stafford to the south, and Houston to the northeast in Harris County.

The city is located between West Bellfort Avenue, U.S. Route 59/I-69, Dairy Ashford Road, and West Airport Boulevard.

Demographics

As of the 2020 United States census, there were 4,767 people, 1,775 households, and 1,274 families residing in the city.

As of the census of 2000, there were 4,912 people, 1,598 households, and 1,358 families residing in the city. The population density was 5,247.8 people per square mile (2,017.6/km). There were 1,616 housing units at an average density of 1,726.5 per square mile (663.8/km). The racial makeup of the city was 71.82% White, 6.09% African American, 0.22% Native American, 15.72% Asian, 0.10% Pacific Islander, 3.24% from other races, and 2.81% from two or more races. Hispanic or Latino of any race were 11.46% of the population.

There were 1,598 households, out of which 43.2% had children under the age of 18 living with them, 70.9% were married couples living together, 10.8% had a female householder with no husband present, and 15.0% were non-families. 12.6% of all households were made up of individuals, and 2.9% had someone living alone who was 65 years of age or older. The average household size was 3.01 and the average family size was 3.28.

In the city, the population was spread out, with 27.9% under the age of 18, 6.8% from 18 to 24, 26.5% from 25 to 44, 29.7% from 45 to 64, and 9.2% who were 65 years of age or older. The median age was 39 years. For every 100 females, there were 90.2 males. For every 100 females age 18 and over, there were 86.4 males.

The median income for a household in the city was $73,180, and the median income for a family was $75,708. Males had a median income of $51,173 versus $35,929 for females. The per capita income for the city was $27,134. About 1.7% of families and 4.5% of the population were below the poverty line, including 5.8% of those under age 18 and 14.5% of those age 65 or over.

Government

Meadows Place has a mayor-alderman form of government. The city council consists of the mayor and five aldermen. As of 2019 the mayor is Charles Jessup, Alderman I is David Mertins, Alderman II is Tia Baker, Alderman III is Rick Staigle, Alderman IV is Kurt Kopczynski, and Alderman V is Kelle K. Mills.

Fort Bend County does not have a hospital district. OakBend Medical Center serves as the county's charity hospital which the county contracts with.

Education

Primary and secondary schools

Meadows Place residents are within the Fort Bend Independent School District. Children attend Meadows Elementary School (located in the city of Meadows Place), Dulles Middle School (in Sugar Land), and Dulles High School (also in Sugar Land). Dulles Junior and Dulles High School were already built as Meadows Place opened. Meadows Elementary was occupied in August 1973. Dulles Junior High School reopened and was reoccupied in 1983.

In 2018 the FBISD administration proposed closing Meadows Elementary. In response parents from the community advocated for keeping the school open. An area resident quoted by KTRK-TV, stated that the members of the community believed that if Meadows Elementary was shut down, their property values would decline.

Sugar Grove Christian School, a preschool and elementary school, is in Meadows Place. It was founded in 1969, as the Sharpstown Christian School.

Colleges and universities
Community college facilities in proximity to Meadows Place are Houston Community College facilities and the Wharton County Junior College facilities. Colleges and universities in proximity to Meadows Place include Houston Baptist University and the University of Houston Sugar Land campus.

Parks and recreation
The Mark McGrath Municipal Park is in Meadows Place. Meadows Place has a community center with a swimming pool, tennis courts, baseball fields and a running track.

In 2011 the city built a lake complex in the middle of their park using Type 1 reclaimed water. This facility is used for fishing, hiking, and birdwatching year round. Pavilions, BBQ pits and picnic tables make a favorite place for families.  The lake is used as source of water for irrigation of city parks saving the city money on subsidence fees. This project was recognized as the number two top environmental project in the State of Texas by Keep Texas Beautiful in 2012 and has had visitors from around the country.

Gallery

References

External links

 City of Meadows Place official website
 

Cities in Texas
Cities in Fort Bend County, Texas
Greater Houston
Populated places established in 1967
1967 establishments in Texas